Straight Ahead is a compilation album by Californian melodic hardcore band Ignite. It contains the In My Time EP (Lost & Found Records, 1995), the first five tracks from Scarred For Life (Lost & Found, 1994), and the title track from Call On My Brothers.

Track listing
A side
 "Straight Ahead"
 "In My Time"
 "Black Light"
 "Faraway"
 "Aggression"
 "Man Against Man"
B side
 "Call On My Brothers"
 "Automatic"
 "Slow"
 "Where They Talk"
 "Shade"
 "Turn"

References

External links

1997 compilation albums
Ignite (band) albums